Rafaël Herman Anna Govaerts (born 1968) is a Belgian botanist. He is particularly noted for his work on plant taxonomy.

He has worked at the Royal Botanic Gardens, Kew since the 1990s, and is the principal contributor to the World Checklist of Selected Plant Families.

References

External sources

20th-century Belgian botanists
Botanists active in Kew Gardens
Botanists with author abbreviations
Belgian expatriates in the United Kingdom
Living people
1968 births
Place of birth missing (living people)
21st-century Belgian botanists